Johannes Bernhardus Theodorus "Hans" Hugenholtz, known in English-speaking countries as John Hugenholtz (October 31, 1914, Vledder – March 25, 1995, Bentveld) was a Dutch designer of race tracks and cars.

Hugenholtz's father, of the same name, was a Protestant minister and peace activist who moved his family to Purmerend in 1918 and Ammerstol in 1924. Hugenholtz studied to be a lawyer and became a journalist by profession, but his interests were in cars. As a young man he was an amateur motorcycle racer. He founded the Nederlandse Auto Race Club in 1936 and was director of the Zandvoort racing circuit from 1949 to 1974. He also founded the Association Internationale de Circuits Permanents in Paris, and the Pionier Automobielen Club in 1956, leading to the Fédération Internationale des Voitures Anciennes (FIVA). Hugenholtz designed a variety of circuits used for Formula One which have been praised for their challenging nature and innovative features. The latter includes the use of multiple layers of stretching, chainlink fences ("catch fences") to slow down and catch cars running off the track, decreasing the chance of driver injury compared to the customary solid barriers. Such a concept was ultimately perfected for oval tracks (and some road courses) in the early 2000s in the form of the SAFER barrier. Amongst others, he designed the circuits Suzuka in Japan (1962), Zolder in Belgium (1963), the Hockenheimring's "Motodrom" stadium section in Germany (1965), Jarama in Spain (1967), Ontario Motor Speedway (together with Portland-based architect Michael Parker) in California (1970), and Nivelles in Belgium (1971). Although often credited with designing the Zandvoort circuit as well, the layout was largely dictated by the existing road layout with Sammy Davis acting as the principal design consultant.

Besides circuits he was involved in the stillborn projects of the Dutch "Barkey" car (1948) and the "Delfino" (1989), the latter based on the Alfa Romeo Alfasud chassis and drivetrain.

Hugenholtz and his wife, Marianne Sophie van Rheineck Leyssius, were involved in a car crash in Zandvoort on January 10, 1995. His wife died immediately, while he succumbed to the injuries two months later at home. His son, Hans Hugenholtz Jr. (born 1950), is a race car driver.

References
Biography in family history (page 32) 
Bio with emphasis on designed tracks 

1914 births
1995 deaths
People from Westerveld
Formula One people
Motorsport venue designers
Dutch designers
Dutch motorsport people
Road incident deaths in the Netherlands